Events from the year 2023 in Moldova.

Incumbents

Events

January 

 1 January:
 The law for the 2023 state budget enters force, with the following numbers: a government revenue amassing 64.8 billion Moldovan lei, 83.1 billion lei spendings and a budget deficit of 18.3 billion lei.
 Changes to Moldova's election code enter force, excepting those for regional elections, that are bound to enter force on 1 January 2024.
 14 January – Due to a wave of Russian missile strikes against Ukraine during the 2022 Russian invasion of Ukraine, a missile falls within the territory of Moldova, in the village of Larga.

February 
 10 February:
 A Russian missile launched as part of an attack against Ukrainian infrastructure crosses the airspace of Moldova.
 Moldovan prime minister Natalia Gavrilita resigns amid an economic crisis and the collateral effects of the ongoing war in neighboring Ukraine.
11 February – Moldovan President Maia Sandu names pro-European Union academic Dorin Recean as the next Prime Minister of Moldova.
13 February – President of Moldova Maia Sandu accuses the Russian government of planning a coup d'état attempt against her.
14 February – 2023 Romania and Moldova high-altitude objects: Moldova temporarily closes its airspace after receiving reports of a "balloon-like object".
22 February – Russian President Vladimir Putin revokes a 2012 foreign policy decree which respects Moldova's sovereignty in resolving the political status of the breakaway Transnistria region.

Scheduled:

 Spring:
 2nd European Political Community Summit
 
 October – 2023 Moldovan local elections

Sports 

 17 August 2022 – 28 May 2023: 2022–23 Moldovan Cup
 26 August 2022 – May 2023: 2022–23 Moldovan Liga 1

Deaths

 9 January – Ala Melnicova, 43, Moldovan singer.

See also 
 2022–2023 Moldovan energy crisis
 2022–2023 Moldovan protests

References 

 
2020s in Moldova
Years of the 21st century in Moldova
Moldova